Glasgow Govan may refer to:

 Glasgow Govan (UK Parliament constituency)
 Glasgow Govan (Scottish Parliament constituency)
 The Govan area of Glasgow
 Govan subway station